Governor Yates may refer to:

Joseph C. Yates, 7th Governor of New York
Richard Yates (politician, born 1815), 13th Governor of Illinois
Richard Yates Jr., 22nd Governor of Illinois, son of Richard Yates.